Bolocco is a surname. Notable people with the surname include:

Cecilia Bolocco (born 1965), Chilean television presenter and model
Diana Bolocco (born 1977), Chilean journalist, sister of Cecilia

Italian-language surnames